Mikhail Fyodorovich Larionov (Russian: Михаи́л Фёдорович Ларио́нов; June 3, 1881 – May 10, 1964) was a Russian avant-garde painter who worked with radical exhibitors and pioneered the first approach to abstract Russian art. His lifelong partner was fellow avant-garde artist, Natalia Goncharova.

Life and work
Larionov was born at Tiraspol, in the Kherson Governorate of the Russian Empire. In 1898 he entered the Moscow School of Painting, Sculpture and Architecture under Isaac Levitan and Valentin Serov. He was suspended three times for his radical outlook. In 1900 he met fellow avant-garde artist Natalia Goncharova and formed a lifelong relationship with her.

From 1902 his style was Impressionism. After a visit to Paris in 1906 he moved into Post-Impressionism and then a Neo-primitive style which derived partly from Russian sign painting. In 1908 he staged the Golden Fleece exhibition in Moscow, which included paintings by international avant-garde artists such as Matisse, Derain, Braque, Gauguin and Van Gogh. Other group shows promoted by him included Tatlin, Chagall and Malevich.

Larionov was a founding member of two important Russian artistic groups Jack of Diamonds (1909–1911) and the more radical Donkey's Tail (1912–1913). He gave names to both groups. His first solo show was for one day in Moscow in 1911. Larionov was influenced by the Georgian artist Niko Pirosmani.

He then became influenced by the Cubo-Futurist art movement, and in 1913, with Natalia Goncharova, he invented Rayonism, which was the first creation of near-abstract art in Russia. He had a one-man show at the Omega Workshops. In 1915 he left Russia and worked with the ballet owner Sergei Diaghilev in Paris on the productions of the Ballets Russes. He spent the rest of his life in France and obtained French citizenship. He died, aged 82, in the Paris suburb of Fontenay-aux-Roses.

In 2001, the Central Bank of Transnistria minted a silver coin honoring this native of today's Transnistria, as part of a series of memorable coins called The Outstanding People of Pridnestrovie.

The highest price paid for a Larionov painting at auction is 2,200,000 British pounds.

He is in the highest category "1A – a world famous artist" in "United Artists Rating". He is buried at Ivry Cemetery, Ivry-sur-Seine.

See also
 List of Russian artists

References

External links
 
Online gallery of Larionov paintings
Marevna, "Smokers" showing Ballet owner Serge de Diaghilev (centre) with Jean Cocteau (to his left), Natalya Goncharova (left) and her husband Mikhail Larionov (right), (scroll down to 3rd painting).
Mikhail Larionov at the McNay Art Museum

1881 births
1964 deaths
People from Tiraspol
People from Tiraspolsky Uyezd
Abstract painters
Neo-primitivism
Avant-garde from the Russian Empire
19th-century painters from the Russian Empire
Scenic designers from the Russian Empire
Modernist theatre
Emigrants from the Russian Empire to France
Burials at Ivry Cemetery
French abstract artists
19th-century male artists from the Russian Empire
Moscow School of Painting, Sculpture and Architecture alumni